The Craighill Channel Upper Range Rear Light is one of a pair of range lights that marks the second section of the shipping channel into Baltimore harbor.

History
This light was constructed in 1885 as part of a range light pair to mark the then newly excavated Craighill Cutoff Channel. A modest iron skeleton tower was erected, pyramidal in form with a wooden, corrugated iron-sheathed square shaft at its center to house the lamp and the access stairway. Its only architectural ornaments were a few windows to light the stairwell and a gallery to allow the outside of the light's window to be cleaned. A keeper's house was built nearby, connected to the light by a brick walk. The original light was a locomotive headlight displaying a fixed white light; this has since been replaced with a more conventional fixture displaying a red light.

The grounds were (and are) surrounded by private property, and in 1888 there was a dispute over access to the light. Other than that the light has passed a quiet life, punctuated only by automation in 1929 and the demolition of the keeper's house. It is still an active aid to navigation.

References

Craighill Range Lighthouses, from the Chesapeake Chapter of the United States Lighthouse Society
Craighill Channel Upper Rear Lighthouse at lighthousefriends.org

External links
http://www.craighillrange.org

Chesapeake Bay Lighthouse Project - Craighill Channel Range Lights
, at Maryland Historical Trust

Lighthouses completed in 1886
Lighthouses in Baltimore County, Maryland
Lighthouses on the National Register of Historic Places in Maryland
Sparrows Point, Maryland
National Register of Historic Places in Baltimore County, Maryland